Schwarzwaldfahrt aus Liebeskummer is a 1974 German comedy film directed by Werner Jacobs and starring Roy Black, Barbara Nielsen and Heidi Hansen.

Cast
 Roy Black ...  Hannes Cremer
 Barbara Nielsen ...  Renate Berndorf
 Heidi Hansen ...  Ilse Berndt
 Elke Aberle ...  Mucki
 Anita Mally ...  Babs
 Peter Millowitsch ...  Zimmermann Uwe
 Hans-Jürgen Bäumler ...  Fotograf Harry
 Gracia-Maria Kaus ...  Janine Breitner
 Rut Rex ...  Luise Klingenberg
 Rolf Olsen ...  Breitner
 Eva Garden ...  Silvia
 Alexander Grill ...  Pit Pfluger
 Ludwig Schmid-Wildy ...  Opa Cremer
 Ilse Peternell ...  Evas Mutter
 Ralf Wolter ...  Evas Vater
 Max Strecker ...  Räbele
 Elfie Pertramer ...  'Trauben'-Wirtin
 Franz Muxeneder ...  Wirt
 Hans Terofal ...  Herr Zwicker
 Claus Biederstaedt ...  Bernhard Klingenberg

References

External links

1974 films
West German films
1974 comedy films
1970s German-language films
Films directed by Werner Jacobs
German comedy films
1970s German films